Aesop's Fables: The Smothers Brothers Way is the seventh comedy album by the Smothers Brothers (released March 15, 1965, on Mercury Records).  It reached number 57 on the Billboard Pop Albums chart. Seven of Aesop's more famous stories and morals are related in this album (or what are intended to be his fables but are often overshadowed by the bickering of the two brothers). The songs were written by John McCarthy.

Track listing
"Overture—Aesop's Fables Our Way" (2:03)
"The Greedy Dog" (2:20)
"A Fox (Maybe I'd Better Stay Me)" (0:24)—Running gag throughout the record where Tom wishes he could be something else but then something happens to quickly convince him that maybe he had better stay himself.
"The Boy Who Cried Wolf" (4:52)
"A Fly (Maybe I'd Better Stay Me)" (0:21)
"The Dog and the Thief" (3:20)
"A Worm (Maybe I'd Better Stay Me)" (0:20)
"The Farmer and His Sons" (4:26)
"The Fox and Grapes"
"A Jellyfish (Maybe I'd Better Stay Me)" (0:15)
"The Bird and the Jar" (6:23)—Explores the saying "Necessity is the mother of invention."
"A Mosquito (Maybe I'd Better Stay Me)" (0:21)
"The Two Frogs" (4:24)
"A Car (Maybe I'd Better Stay Me)" (0:45)
"Aesop Knew (Reprise)" (1:49)

Personnel
Dick Smothers – vocals, double bass
Tom Smothers – vocals, guitar

Chart positions

References

External links
Smothers Brothers discography

1965 albums
Smothers Brothers albums
Mercury Records albums